Nikola Banjac is a Serbian former football defender.

Club career

Spartak Subotica
He made his Jelen SuperLiga debut for Spartak Subotica on home match versus Partizan on 25 May 2014.

References

External links
 
 Nikola Banjac stats at utakmica.rs
 

1996 births
Living people
Sportspeople from Subotica
Association football defenders
Serbian footballers
Serbia youth international footballers
FK Spartak Subotica players
FK Bačka 1901 players
Pécsi MFC players
Serbian SuperLiga players
Nemzeti Bajnokság III players
Serbian expatriate footballers
Expatriate footballers in Hungary
Serbian expatriate sportspeople in Hungary